Hugh Hill may refer to:

 Sir Hugh Hill, 1st Baronet (1728–1795) of the Hill baronets, member for Londonderry City in Parliament of Ireland
Hugh Hill (privateer) (1740–1829), American mariner and Revolutionary War privateer.
 Hugh Lawson White Hill (1810–1892), American politician
 Hugh Hill (baseball) (1879–1958), American baseball player
 Hugh Morgan Hill (1921–2009), American folklorist & street performer, a.k.a. Brother Blue

See also
 Hill (surname)